The 1974 German Formula Three Championship was a multi-event motor racing championship for single-seat open wheel formula racing cars held across Europe. The championship featured drivers competing in two-litre Formula Three racing cars which conformed to the technical regulations, or formula, for the championship. It commenced on 5 May at Neubiberg and ended at Nürburgring on 8 September after ten rounds.

Willi Deutsch was the champion, winning four races and 137 points. Dieter Kern finished as runner-up, winning five races and 135 points. Ernst Maring completed the top-three in the drivers' standings. Harald Ertl was the only other driver who was able to win a race in the season.

Calendar
All rounds were held in West Germany, excepting Salzburg round which were held in Austria.

Championship standings
Points are awarded as follows:

References

External links
 

German Formula Three Championship seasons
Formula Three season